Under the Dome may refer to:

 Under the Dome (novel), a 2009 novel by Stephen King
 Under the Dome (TV series), a 2013–2015 television series adaptation
 Under the Dome (film), a 2015 Chinese documentary film
 Under the Dome (band), an ambient music band from Scotland